The 59th Annual Bengal Film Journalists' Association Awards were held on 1996, honoring the best
Indian cinema in 1995.

Main Awards

Best India Film (In Order of Merit) 
 Mammo
 Droh Kaal
 Charachar

Best Director 
 Buddhadev Dasgupta - Charachar

Best Actor 
 Sabyasachi Chakraborty - Kakababu Here Gelen ?

Best Actress 
 Indrani Halder & Laboni Sarkar - Charachar

Best Supporting Actor 
 Soumitra Chatterjee - Kakababu Here Gelen ?

Best Supporting Actress 
 Roopa Ganguly - Ujan

Best Music Director 
 Anupam Ghatak - Kencho Khoodte Keute

Best Lyricist 
 Shibdas Banerjee - Sansar Sangram

Best Male Playback Singer 
 Kumar Sanu - Kencho Khoodte Keute

Best Female Playback Singer 
 Sreeradha Bandyopadhyay - Boumoni

Best Screenplay 
 Buddhadev Dasgupta - Charachar

Best Cinematography 
 Soumendu Roy - Charachar

Best Art Director 
 Rupchand Kundu - Amodini

Best Editor 
 Ujjal Nandy - Charachar

Babulal Chowkhani Memorial Trophy

Best Original Story 

 Prafulla Roy – Charachar

Most Outstanding Work of The Year 
 Mani Ratnam – Bombay

Bagishwar Jha Memorial Award

Best Book on Cinema 

 Amitabha Chattopadhyay – Chalachhitra, Samaj O Satyajit

B. C. Agarwal Memorial Award

Best Film Critic /Journalist 

 Santanu Chakraborty

Documentary Section

Best Documentary (Film) 
 A Living Legend

Best Director Documentary (Film) 
 Raja Sen - Film Maker for Freedom

Hindi Section

Best Director 
 Govind Nihalani - Droh Kaal

Best Actor 
 Aamir Khan - Akele Hum Akele Tum & Rangeela

Best Actress 
 Farida Jalal - Mammo

Satyajit Ray Lifetime Achievement Award 
 Shri Tapan Sinha

References 

Bengal Film Journalists' Association Awards
1995 Indian film awards